Wigeon, or Widgeon, mainly refers to a group of three duck species of the genus Anas.

It may also refer to:

8440 Wigeon, main belt asteroid
Grumman Widgeon, American 1940s amphibian aircraft
HMS Widgeon, Royal Navy schooner launched in 1806
MV Widgeon, a United States Bureau of Fisheries and Fish and Wildlife Service fishery patrol boat of 1919–1944 that previously served in the U.S. Navy as 
Wackett Widgeon, Australian 1920s amphibious aircraft
Westland Widgeon (helicopter), a helicopter
Westland Widgeon (fixed wing), British 1920s civil light aircraft
Widgeon, California, a former town in Modoc County
, the name of two U.S. Navy ships
Widgeon 12, an American sailboat design